All For One Caribbean was an annual international song contest for the Caribbean region. Started in 2013, the competition was held three times since its inception. The first All For One Caribbean contest was held on 21 October in Fort de France, Martinique.

Format
All For One Caribbean was an annual song contest which was created by Joslyn Vautor, Dominique Pompee and Bernard Lagier, the three founders are all members of the Culturelles Caribbean Connection. The competition is loosely based around the format of the Eurovision Song Contest, All For One Caribbean however does not have any semi finals. A juror from each nation awards between 1 and 100 points for every entry, except their own.

Unlike the Eurovision Song Contest the competition does not go to the winning country, it has remained in Martinique for all editions of the competition to date. Furthermore, singers and songs for the competition are selected by each countries Ministry of Tourism, no country has to date held a public selection.

Participation
To date a total of 13 sovereign states and dependent countries have participated in at least one edition of the All For One Caribbean Song Contest. 35 sovereign states and dependent countries are eligible to participate in the competition.

Winners

By year

References

External links

Singing competitions
Song contests
Recurring events established in 2013
Song awards